Dirk Krüssenberg (born 29 September 1945) is a German former footballer who played as a goalkeeper. He is the first goalkeeper in Bundesliga history who was keeping a clean sheet in his three first Bundesliga games.

References

External links
 Dirk Krüssenberg at kleeblatt-chronik.de 
 

1945 births
Living people
German footballers
Association football goalkeepers
Bundesliga players
Fortuna Düsseldorf players
SpVgg Greuther Fürth players